The Rosalia Railroad Bridge was built by the Chicago, Milwaukee, St. Paul and Pacific Railroad (also known as the Milwaukee Road) in 1915 to replace an earlier timber trestle. The bridge was designed as a concrete arch, unusual for a railroad bridge, because it crosses the Northern Pacific Railroad tracks (a rival railroad), a state highway, and is visible from Steptoe Battlefield State Park. The railroad wanted an impressive-looking bridge. The viaduct consists of two spans, separated by an embankment. East of the  embankment there is a  span crossing over the Northern Pacific tracks. To the west is a  span that crosses Pine Creek, railroad tracks, and the highway.

When the Milwaukee Road went bankrupt in the 1980s. the bridge and right-of-way were acquired by the State of Washington.

The bridge was listed in the National Register of Historic Places due to its design.

Notes

References
Soderberg, Lisa. . National Register of Historic Places Inventory - Nomination Form. On file at the National Park Service, Washington DC.
Soderberg, Lisa. Rosalia Railroad Bridge. HAER Inventory, Historic American Engineering Record, on file at the National Park Service, Washington, DC.

Chicago, Milwaukee, St. Paul and Pacific Railroad
Railroad bridges on the National Register of Historic Places in Washington (state)
Open-spandrel deck arch bridges in the United States
Bridges completed in 1915
Transportation buildings and structures in Whitman County, Washington
Railroad bridges in Washington (state)
National Register of Historic Places in Whitman County, Washington
Concrete bridges in the United States